Kaleste is a village in Hiiumaa Parish, Hiiu County, in northwestern Estonia.

The village is first mentioned in 1844 (Kalleste). Historically, the village was part of Kõrgessaare Manor.

References
 

Villages in Hiiu County